Ten Ren's Tea or Tian Ren's Tea is a Taiwan-based company that specializes in tea and ginseng products.

History

Founded in 1953 in Taiwan by Ray Ho Lee, Ten Ren's Group (天仁集團) also operates Cha for Tea teahouses in Southern California as well as Ten Ren's Tea (天仁茗茶) stores in California and six Ten Rens in New York, and other places, and through the subsidiary Ten Fu Group (天福集團) produces and sells tea products in China, where much of its activity now takes place.

By 2003 it had 113 outlets globally, making it Taiwan's largest tea shop chain.

Global

Ten Ren Tea is located in Australia, Japan, Canada, Malaysia, the United States and other countries. The Ten Ren Tea and the Lu-Yu Tea Institute are part of the Ten Fu Group. The Lu-Yu Tea Culture Institute (陸羽茶藝中心) was founded in 1980. Ten Fu Group in 1993, as a way of bringing Taiwanese tea expertise back to the Chinese mainland. Ten Fu now has over 1000 retails stores across China "as of 2010". Tenfu Tea College (天福茶學院) was founded in 2007 by Ten Fu Group.

Ten Ren's Tea Vancouver store was featured as a challenge location in an episode of The Amazing Race Canada. The episode was watched by 2.9 million Canadians.

See also
Taiwanese tea

References

External links

 Ten Ren's Group - Official Taiwan Website
 Ten Ren's Tea Group - Official Canada Website
 TenRenUSA.com - Official USA website

1953 establishments in Taiwan
Companies based in Taipei
Food and drink companies established in 1953
Tea brands
Tea companies of Taiwan
Tea houses
Taiwanese brands
Bubble tea brands